Kash Rud (also Romanized as Kash Rūd) is a village in Pain Taleqan Rural District, in the Central District of Taleqan County, Alborz Province, Iran. At the 2006 census, its population was 95, in 42 families.

References 

Populated places in Taleqan County